Henry Joseph Lampe  (September 19, 1872 – September 16, 1936) was a pitcher in Major League Baseball. He played for the Boston Beaneaters in 1894 and the Philadelphia Phillies in 1895. He played in the minors through 1899, primarily in the Eastern League.

External links

1872 births
1936 deaths
Major League Baseball pitchers
Boston Beaneaters players
Philadelphia Phillies players
Baseball players from Boston
19th-century baseball players
Brockton Shoemakers players
Buffalo Bisons (minor league) players
Lawrence Indians players
New York Metropolitans (minor league) players
Syracuse Stars (minor league baseball) players
Fall River Indians players
Portsmouth Browns players
Toronto Canucks players
Worcester Farmers players
American expatriate baseball players in Canada